William and Ann was launched in Bermuda in 1818. In 1824 the Hudson's Bay Company (HBC) purchased William and Ann. She made three voyages to Fort George on the Columbia River, and was lost on 10 March 1829 on her fourth as she was arriving there.

Career
William and Ann first appeared in Lloyd's Register (LR) in 1823.

Hudson's Bay Company

The HBC purchased William and Ann, and her stores, on 19 May 1824 for £1,500. Henry Hanwell Jr. was her master from 1824 to 1828. She sailed from Gravesend on 27 July and on 12 April 1825 anchored at Fort George.

On 25 June William and Ann crossed the bar on her way north to Portland Canal. The aims of the voyage were to trade with the natives and to get information on American trade in the region. The HBC expected that the region would become British territory after negotiations being undertaken with the Russians. On 30 July at Nootka Sound. She then visited the Straight of Georgia and spent about a month trading there. On 3 September she crossed the bar at the Columbia River, and arrived at Fort George on 5 September. On her cruise William and Ann had gathered 400 skins. 

On 25 October William and Ann crossed the bar on the way back to London. She arrived back at London on 5 April 1826.

On 25 September 1826 William and Ann sailed for the Columbia River in company with another HBC vessel, the schooner . William and Ann sailed via the Sandwich Islands and anchored off Fort Vancouver on 10 May 1827.

William and Ann left on 6 July but did not clear the Columbia River until 23 August. She arrived in the Channel on 6 February 1828.

On 16 September 1828 William and Ann, John Swan, master, sailed from Plymouth, bound for Fort Vancouver. The two vessels parted in the Bay of Biscay on 24 September.

Fate
On 10 March 1829 William and Ann was wrecked on the bar of the Columbia River. All 26 people on board died, but most of them victims of an attack by the local Clatsop people.

Citations

1818 ships
Ships built in Bermuda
Age of Sail merchant ships of England
Hudson's Bay Company ships
Maritime incidents in March 1829